George FitzRoy may refer to:
 George FitzRoy, 1st Duke of Northumberland (1665–1716)
 George FitzRoy, 4th Duke of Grafton (1760–1844)
 George FitzRoy, Earl of Euston (1715–1747)